Seworgan (meaning Goethgen's ford) is a village in the parish of Constantine in west Cornwall, England, United Kingdom.

References

Villages in Cornwall